Flavokavain A is a flavokavain found in the kava plant. It induces apoptosis in bladder cancer cells via a Bax protein-dependent and mitochondria-dependent apoptotic pathway.

Flavokavains A and B enhance hepatotoxicity of paracetamol, underscoring a potentially serious interaction between paracetamol and kava.

See also
Kavalactone

References

External links
Flavokawain A at the United States National Library of Medicine

Kava
Phenol ethers